Gloucester Gate is a residential facility in Regent's Park, London. It is a Grade I listed building.

History
The building was designed by John Nash and built by Richard Mott, being completed in 1827. The building, which features a range of fluted pilasters of the Ionic order on pedestal bases, was originally built as eleven terraced houses. No. 6 was the home of the pharmaceutical entrepreneur, Sir Henry Wellcome, while No. 15 was the home of the author, W. W. Jacobs.

References

Grade I listed buildings in the City of Westminster
Buildings and structures completed in 1827